Symmachia basilissa is a butterfly species of the family Riodinidae. It is present in Brazil and French Guiana.

Subspecies
Symmachia basilissa basilissa (Brazil: Pará)
Symmachia basilissa paracatuensis Callaghan, 2001 (Brazil: Minas Gerais)

See also 
 List of butterflies of French Guiana

References

External links

Symmachia
Lepidoptera of Brazil
Lepidoptera of French Guiana
Butterflies described in 1868
Riodinidae of South America